Liolaemus xanthoviridis is a species of lizard in the family Liolaemidae. It is endemic to  Argentina.

References

xanthoviridis
Lizards of South America
Endemic fauna of Argentina
Reptiles of Argentina
Reptiles described in 1980
Taxa named by José Miguel Alfredo María Cei